The word rouelle can refer to:

Things
A yellow badge that Jews were forced to wear as an identifying mark when living under hostile regimes, especially in Nazi Germany
Pont Rouelle, a bridge in Paris

People
Guillaume-François Rouelle, French chemist who proposed the concept of a base
Hilaire Rouelle, younger brother of above, French chemist who discovered urea

Places
Rouelles, a French commune in the Haute-Marne département of the Champagne-Ardenne region